Christmas Clix is a Christmas-themed puzzle game available for the Wii's download service WiiWare, and for the Mac and PC. Co-developed by American studios MunsieGames and JV Games, Inc. it was released on November 30, 2009.

The game is based on a match 3 puzzler with several twists, noted as an "arcade puzzler." There are power-ups that Santa gives you to help you along the way, you can be awarded a mini-game. There are 100 levels and 10 mini games to unlock.

Reception 

Christmas Clix received favorable reviews for its unique and indepth gameplay. Nintendo Life has given it a 7 of 10 rating.

External links 
 Official Site
 JV Games site
 Munsiegames site

References 

2009 video games
Christmas video games
JV Games games
MacOS games
Puzzle video games
Video games developed in the United States
WiiWare games
Windows games